Adams Peak may refer to the following places:

Adams Peak (Antarctica)
Adams Peak (California)

See also
Adam's Peak, mountain in Sri Lanka